Viscosity is usually described as the property of a fluid which determines the rate at which local momentum differences are equilibrated. Rotational viscosity is a property of a fluid which determines the rate at which local angular momentum differences are equilibrated. In the classical case, by the equipartition theorem, at equilibrium, if particle collisions can transfer angular momentum as well as linear momentum, then these degrees of freedom will have the same average energy. If there is a lack of equilibrium between these degrees of freedom, then the rate of equilibration will be determined by the rotational viscosity coefficient.

Rotational viscosity has traditionally been thought to require rotational degrees of freedom for the fluid particles, such as in liquid crystals. In these fluids, the rotational degrees of freedom allow angular momentum to become a dynamical quantity that can be locally relaxed, leading to rotational viscosity. However, recent theoretical work has predicted that rotational viscosity ought to also be present in viscous electron fluids (see Gurzhi effect) in anisotropic metals. In these cases, the ionic lattice explicitly breaks rotational symmetry and applies torques to the electron fluid, implying non-conservation of angular momentum and hence rotational viscosity.

Derivation and Use

The angular momentum density of a fluid element is written either as an antisymmetric tensor or, equivalently, as a pseudovector. As a tensor, 
the equation for the conservation of angular momentum for a simple fluid with no external forces is written:

Note that the Einstein summation convention is used, where summation is assumed over pairs of matched indices. The angular momentum of a fluid element can be separated into extrinsic angular momentum density due to the flow and intrinsic angular momentum density due to the rotation of the fluid particles about their center of mass:

where the extrinsic angular momentum density is:

The conservation of linear momentum equation is written:

and it can be shown that this implies that:

Subtracting this from the equation for the conservation of angular momentum yields:

Any situation in which this last term is zero will result in the total pressure tensor being symmetric, and the conservation of angular momentum equation will be redundant with the conservation of linear momentum. If, however, the internal rotational degrees of freedom of the particles are coupled to the flow (via the velocity term in the above equation), then the total pressure tensor will not be symmetric, with its antisymmetric component describing the rate of angular momentum exchange between the flow and the particle rotation.

In the linear approximation for this transport of angular momentum, the rate of flow is written:

References

Category

Fluid dynamics
Viscosity